Below is a list of notable men's and women's artistic gymnastics international events scheduled held in 2019, as well as the medalists.

Calendar of events

Medalists

Men

International championships

Continental championships

Multi-sport events

World Cup series

Women

International championships

Continental championships

Multi-sport events

World Cup series

Season's best international scores 
Only the scores of senior gymnasts from international events have been included below; one score per gymnast.

Women

All-around

Vault

Uneven bars

Balance beam

Floor exercise

Men

All-Around

Floor exercise

Pommel Horse

Rings

Vault

Parallel Bars

Horizontal Bar

References

 
Artistic
Artistic gymnastics
Gymnastics by year
2019 sport-related lists